Prestestranda is the administrative centre of Drangedal municipality, Norway. Its population is 1,223.

The village was built around the train station which appeared with the Sørlandet Line in 1927.

References

Villages in Vestfold og Telemark
Drangedal